Rita Joanne Simons (born 10 March 1977) is an English actress and singer from London. She is best known for playing Roxy Mitchell in the BBC soap opera EastEnders from 2007 to 2017, when her character was killed-off, alongside her on screen character's sister Ronnie Mitchell (Samantha Womack). For her performance on the show Simons received many accolades, including the 2008 National Television Award for Most Popular Newcomer.

On 12 November 2018, Simons was confirmed to be participating in that year's series of I'm a Celebrity...Get Me Out of Here!. She was the fourth to be eliminated on 4 December 2018.

Personal life
Simons was born at Whipps Cross University Hospital in Whipp Cross, Leytonstone, London. She is Susan (née Franks) and Mark Simons daughter. Both of her parents are Jewish. She has an older brother, Ben. Through her paternal aunt's marriage, Simons is the niece of billionaire businessman Lord Sugar, who is best known for appearing in the BBC reality series The Apprentice.

In August 2004, she married hairdresser Theo Silverston. They have twin daughters. The couple separated in 2018.

Simons is best friends with co-star Samantha Womack, who played her on-screen sister Ronnie Mitchell. She is also good friends with Danniella Westbrook, who played her on-screen cousin Sam Mitchell.

Simons has been diagnosed with scoliosis.

In July 2018, Simons revealed that she has been diagnosed with ADHD, OCD, anxiety and insomnia.

Career

Music
Before her acting career, Simons was in the group Girls@Play, who had a couple of hit singles before splitting up. Their songs included "Airhead" and a cover of Mel and Kim's "Respectable". Simons then joined a different group called Charli with three other members, including Shar from the Paradiso Girls, and released a single titled "Feel Me".

Acting
Simons has made appearances in the Sky 1 dramas Dream Team (2002) and Mile High (2003; as Hannah), as well as the ITV drama London's Burning.

On 11 May 2007, it was announced that she would be joining the cast of EastEnders as Roxy Mitchell, alongside Samantha Womack who played Roxy's sister Ronnie Mitchell. Of her role, Simons said: "I've always watched EastEnders and it's been my dream to become part of the Mitchell family." Simons temporarily departed from EastEnders in late 2015 (the character departed from screens from 1 January to 4 May 2016), allowing the actress to take part in a Snow White pantomime at the Marlowe Theatre in Canterbury, over the 2015–2016 Christmas and New Year period. In August 2016, it was announced that Simons was leaving EastEnders along with Samantha Womack. Her on-screen character Roxy Mitchell drowned in a swimming pool in an episode broadcast on New Year's Day 2017, along with her sister Ronnie.

Simons appeared as Paulette Bonafonte in the 2017–2018 UK tour of Legally Blonde: the Musical in 2017. In 2019, Simons played the role of ‘Miss Hedge’ in the hit musical Everybody's Talking About Jamie at the Apollo Theatre. She was to take on the role of Velma von Tussle in the 2021 revival of Hairspray at the London Coliseum. In 2022, she joined the cast of TV show, Professor T.

Charity work
In December 2009, Simons visited her old secondary school, Watford Grammar School for Girls, to open the Christmas fair.

In December 2010, Simons launched the RNID Christmas Concert where she announced that her five-year-old daughter is deaf.

In July 2011, Simons held an autograph session at the St Nicholas Primary School summer fair in Elstree.

In December 2011, Simons hosted the annual Action on Hearing Loss concert along with the Mayor of Camden, Councillor Abdul Quadir.

She appeared on a Big Star's Little Star episode, broadcast on 1 April 2015, and won £13,000 for charity.

Filmography

Television

Film

Theatre

Accolades

See also
 List of I'm a Celebrity...Get Me Out of Here! (British TV series) contestants

References

External links
 
 
 
Inside Soap Awards 2008

1977 births
Living people
English people of Jewish descent
English Jews
Jewish English actresses
English female models
English television actresses
English soap opera actresses
People with obsessive–compulsive disorder
People educated at Watford Grammar School for Girls
21st-century English women singers
21st-century English singers
I'm a Celebrity...Get Me Out of Here! (British TV series) participants